Hans Hinkel (22 June 1901  – 8 February 1960) was a German journalist and ministerial official in Nazi Germany. He studied at the University of Bonn, where he was a member of the academic fencing fraternity Sugambria. Hinkel had served in the Freikorps and joined the NSDAP in 1921. From 1930 to 1932 he was the editor of the Völkischer Beobachter in Berlin. After the Nazis seized power in 1933, he became Reich Organization Leader of the Militant League for German Culture (Kampfbund für Deutsche Kultur or KfdK) and manager of the Reich Culture Chamber (Reichskulturkammer).

Background
From 1935, Hinkel was responsible as a special commissioner for "cultural particulars" at the Reich Ministry for the People's Enlightenment and Propaganda. In this function, Hinkel, an SS officer and member of the Blood Order, was responsible for Anti-Semitic issues and particularly for the removal of Jews ("Entjudung") from cultural undertakings. Hans Hinkel was, for instance, the driving force behind the pressure brought to bear on the popular actor Joachim Gottschalk to get him to separate from his Jewish wife. In late 1942, Hans Hinkel took over the leadership of the film department at the Reich Ministry for the People's Enlightenment and Propaganda.

Hinkel also organized test screenings of films before propaganda experts, institutions, and authorities. Testing propaganda films for their effectiveness was an ongoing business. Since Anti-Semitic film propaganda touched on one of Nazism's core issues, these test screenings served at the same time as a way to commit the whole propaganda apparatus to a common, radical line. As Reich Culture Governor, Hinkel's work consisted of, among other things, approving events staged by the Cultural Federation of German Jews (Kulturbund Deutscher Juden) on a case-by-case basis. Hinkel thereby saw to it that this Federation was sealed off from non-Jewish artists' contributions. The Federation was dissolved in 1942.

In March 1944, Hans Hinkel was appointed National Film Superintendent (Reichsfilmintendant).  In this capacity he took steps to ensure that during the final phase of the war more than half of the members of the German feature industry fulfilled their duty to serve in the German army and the militia (Volkssturm).  In 1945 he was interned by the Allies and in 1947 he was handed over to Poland to face charges for his involvement in theft of Polish cultural properties. After the deportation from Poland into the Federal Republic of Germany 1952 Hinkel was never held responsible for his acts.  Hinkel's works, published under the titles Manual of the National Cultural Chamber and Jew Quarter of Europe were placed in the Soviet zone of occupation on the list of prohibited literature.

See also
List of Nazi Party leaders and officials

References

External links
 

1901 births
1960 deaths
People from Worms, Germany
People from Rhenish Hesse
Nazi Party politicians
Militant League for German Culture members
Nazi Party officials
Holocaust perpetrators
Nazi propaganda
SS-Gruppenführer
20th-century Freikorps personnel
Members of the Reichstag of the Weimar Republic
Members of the Reichstag of Nazi Germany